The Gulfport-Biloxi Metropolitan Statistical Area is a metropolitan statistical area (MSA) in the Mississippi Gulf Coast region that includes four counties – Hancock, Harrison, Jackson and Stone. The principal cities are Gulfport and Biloxi. The 2010 census placed the Gulfport-Biloxi MSA population at 388,488, though as of 2019, it was estimated to have increased to 417,665.  The area was significantly impacted by Hurricane Katrina on August 29, 2005, and prior to the hurricane, had experienced steady to moderate population growth. However, growth has since rebounded, with the population steadily increasing every year throughout the 2010s.

Counties
Hancock
Harrison
Jackson
Stone

Communities

Cities and towns
Bay St. Louis
Biloxi (Principal city)
Diamondhead
D'Iberville
Gautier
Gulfport (Principal city)
Long Beach
Moss Point
Ocean Springs
Pascagoula
Pass Christian
Waveland
Wiggins

Census-designated places

 Big Point
 Escatawpa
 Gulf Hills
 Gulf Park Estates
 Helena
 Hickory Hills (former CDP)
 Hurley
 Kiln
 Latimer
 Lyman
 Pearlington
 Saucier
 Shoreline Park
 St. Martin
 Vancleave
 Wade

Unincorporated places
Bayou Caddy
Bond
Clermont Harbor
Cuevas
De Lisle
East Moss Point
Gulf Islands National Seashore
Howison
Lakeshore
McHenry
Orange Grove
Perkinston
Woolmarket

Demographics
As of the census of 2000, there were 246,190 people, 93,182 households, and 64,027 families residing within the MSA. The racial makeup of the MSA was 76.47% White, 18.49% African American, 0.47% Native American, 2.17% Asian, 0.07% Pacific Islander, 0.76% from other races, and 1.57% from two or more races. Hispanic or Latino of any race were 2.38% of the population.

There were 93,182 households, out of which 33.4% had children under the age of 18 living with them, 49.7% were married couples living together, 14.3% had a female householder with no husband present, and 31.3% were non-families. 25.4% of all households were made up of individuals, and 8.5% had someone living alone who was 65 years of age or older. The average household size was 2.60 and the average family size was 3.06.

In the MSA the population was spread out, with 25.9% under the age of 18, 10.5% from 18 to 24, 29.9% from 25 to 44, 22.1% from 45 to 64, and 11.6% who were 65 years of age or older. The median age was 35 years. For every 100 females there were 98.9 males. For every 100 females age 18 and over, there were 97.1 males.

The median income for a household in the MSA was $33,774, and the median income for a family was $39,536. Males had a median income of $29,452 versus $21,775 for females. The per capita income for the MSA was $16,822.

See also
Mississippi census statistical areas
List of metropolitan areas in Mississippi
List of micropolitan areas in Mississippi
List of cities in Mississippi
List of towns and villages in Mississippi
List of census-designated places in Mississippi
List of United States metropolitan areas

References

 
Geography of Hancock County, Mississippi
Geography of Harrison County, Mississippi
Geography of Stone County, Mississippi